Left Behind is a series of 16 best-selling novels by Tim LaHaye and Jerry B. Jenkins, and the title of the first novel in the series.

Left Behind may also refer to:

Arts, entertainment, and media

Film 
Left Behind (film series)
Left Behind: The Movie, 2000 film
Left Behind II: Tribulation Force, 2002 film
Left Behind: World at War, 2005 film
Left Behind (2014 film), an American apocalyptic thriller film, based on the novel
 Left Behind: Rise of the Antichrist, 2023 sequel to the 2014 film

Television 
 "Left Behind" (Arrow), a 2015 episode
 "Left Behind" (The Last of Us), a 2023 episode
 "Left Behind" (Legends of Tomorrow), a 2016 episode
 "Left Behind" (Lost), a 2007 episode
 Left Behind (The Simpsons), a 2018 episode

Music 
 "Left Behind" (Slipknot song)
 "Left Behind" (CSS song)

Video games 
 The Last of Us: Left Behind, a 2014 expansion for The Last of Us
 Left Behind: Eternal Forces, a 2006 real-time strategy game

See also 
 Serenity: Those Left Behind, a comic published by Dark Horse Comics